National Route 7 (in Spanish, officially Ruta Nacional Número 7 "José Gaspar Rodríguez de Francia",, or simply Ruta Siete) is an important highway of Paraguay. It links the departmental capitals of Caaguazú and Alto Paraná, Coronel Oviedo and Ciudad del Este, respectively. Crossing a total of 10 districts of both departments. It starts on the roundabout of Coronel Oviedo and ends at the Friendship Bridge, on the Paraná River, traversing .

Distances and important cities 

The following table shows the distances traversed by Ruta 7 in each different department, and important cities that it passes by (or near).

7
Alto Paraná Department
Caaguazú Department